There are several explanations as to the origin of the Book of Mormon. Adherents to the Latter Day Saint movement view the book as a work of divinely inspired scripture. Non-Mormon theories of authorship propose that it is solely the work of man.

Adherents mostly accept Joseph Smith's account of translating ancient golden plates inscribed by prophets. Smith preached that the angel Moroni, a prophet in the Book of Mormon, directed him in the 1820s to a hill near his home in Palmyra, New York, where the plates were buried. Besides Smith himself, there were at least 11 witnesses who said they saw the plates in 1829, and three also claiming to have been visited by an angel. Several other witnesses observed Smith dictating the text that eventually became the Book of Mormon.

Skeptics of Smith's account ask several questions: (1) whether Joseph Smith actually had gold plates; (2) whether the Book of Mormon was divinely inspired; (3) whether it was written by Smith or an associate (such as Oliver Cowdery or Sidney Rigdon); and (4) whether the book was based on prior works, such as the View of the Hebrews, the Spalding Manuscript (often seen spelled as "Spaulding"), or the King James Version of the Bible.

Theories of authorship

There are differing views on the origin of the Book of Mormon.
 Joseph Smith as the sole author, without intentional assistance, possibly reflecting Smith's own life events.  
 Theories of multiple authors posit collaboration with others to produce the Book of Mormon, generally citing Book of Mormon scribe Oliver Cowdrey or Sidney Rigdon as potential co-authors.
 Miraculous origins theories generally accept Joseph Smith's own account, that he translated an ancient record compiled and abridged by Mormon, a pre-Columbian resident of the Western Hemisphere.Variations of this theory only include that the text is a divinely inspired narrative, regardless of its historicity (i.e., "Inspired Fiction"), or an example of "automatic writing".

Smith as sole author
According to some, the simplest explanation is that Joseph Smith authored the Book of Mormon himself, without the intentional complicity of anyone else. One argument for this theory is that the Book of Mormon reflects Smith's life experiences. There are, for instance, claimed parallels between the tree of life vision in the Book of Mormon and a dream of Joseph Smith Sr.

The golden plates were sometimes called the "Golden Bible" in early descriptions. The label "Golden Bible" predates the Book of Mormon, as legends of such an artifact circulated in Canada and upstate New York while Smith was growing up in Vermont. Smith's companion Peter Ingersoll later claimed that Smith had told him of the legend of the Canadian Golden Bible.

This particular theory does not hold much weight among believers, who often reference a quote from Emma Smith, Joseph Smith's first wife. She wrote that Joseph "could neither write nor dictate a coherent and well-worded letter, let alone dictat[e] a book like the Book of Mormon."

Theories of multiple authors

The claim is also made that Smith was aided in the creation of the Book of Mormon by one or more co-authors, such as Sidney Rigdon or Oliver Cowdery. Both Rigdon and Cowdery had more formal education than Smith.

David Persuitte highlights a revelation of Smith's from March 1829, that apparently limited Smith's power to translation. Persuitte argues the wording of the revelations indicates at least one other secret collaborator, as "if he had some partners who had imposed it upon him in order to prevent him from gathering too much power to himself." In contrast, co-authors Jerald and Sandra Tanner argue the early text of the revelation merely demonstrates that "Joseph Smith was not planning on doing any other work besides the Book of Mormon".

Oliver Cowdery

Oliver Cowdery was a third-cousin of Lucy Mack Smith, Joseph Smith's mother. A pastor who lived near Cowdery, Ethan Smith, had written View of the Hebrews, another work that has been posited as a source for the Book of Mormon. Cowdery served as scribe during the transcription of the Book of Mormon, and was one of the Three Witnesses to the golden plates.  Cowdery later resigned and was excommunicated in 1838, then re-joined the LDS Church in 1848.

Sidney Rigdon

Sidney Rigdon was a Baptist preacher, and one of the most prominent of Smith's earliest followers. Rigdon served as a scribe for the Book of Moses, received revelations jointly with Smith, served as Smith's spokesperson, and with Smith carried the title "Prophet, Seer, and Revelator". After Smith's death, Rigdon led his own faction of Latter Day Saints and continued to announce revelations.

Pointing away from Rigdon's co-authorship, there is little or no extant evidence that Smith knew of or was in contact with Rigdon until after the Book of Mormon was published, although some witness accounts place Rigdon in upstate New York in 1825 and 1826. Most histories state that Rigdon learned of the Book of Mormon from Parley P. Pratt, a member of Rigdon's Kirtland congregation, who had joined the Church of Christ in Palmyra in September 1830. Upon Pratt's return to Ohio, Rigdon reportedly learned of Smith and the Book of Mormon and was baptized by Pratt. According to these histories, only after his own baptism did Rigdon travel to New York, first meeting Smith in December 1830, nine months after the Book of Mormon's publication.

Miraculous origin theory

According to the accounts of Joseph Smith and his associates, the original record was engraved on thin, malleable sheets of metal ("leaves") with the appearance of gold, and bound with three rings at one edge. The engraving was reportedly of considerable skill. According to the narrative of the book, the prophet-historian Mormon abridged other records of the local civilizations from the preceding millennia. Mormon then gave the record to his son, Moroni, who inscribed a few additional words of his own, and concealed the plates about AD 400. Near the end of Moroni's life (approximately AD 421), he placed these plates along with several other items in a stone box in a hillside (now named Cumorah) near present-day Palmyra, New York.

By Smith's account, on September 21, 1823, this same Moroni, now an angel, appeared to Smith to instruct him about this ancient record and its destined translation into English. Smith was shown the location of the plates (and the other items in the box), but was not immediately allowed to take them. After four years of annually meeting with the angel, Smith was finally entrusted with the plates. Through the power of God and the Urim and Thummim (ancient seeing stones buried with the plates), he was able to translate the Reformed Egyptian inscriptions. Smith was commanded to show the plates to only certain people. Accounts by these individuals are recorded in the introduction of the Book of Mormon as "The Testimony of the Three Witnesses" and "The Testimony of the Eight Witnesses."

John Rigdon, discussing an interview with his father Sidney Rigdon in 1865, states:

My father, after I had finished saying what I have repeated above, looked at me a moment, raised his hand above his head and slowly said, with tears glistening in his eyes: "My son, I can swear before high heaven that what I have told you about the origin of [the Book of Mormon] is true. Your mother and sister, Mrs. Athalia Robinson, were present when that book was handed to me in Mentor, Ohio, and all I ever knew about the origin of [the Book of Mormon] was what Parley P. Pratt, Oliver Cowdery, Joseph Smith and the witnesses who claimed they saw the plates have told me, and in all of my intimacy with Joseph Smith he never told me but one story.

Oliver Cowdery's wife confirmed, after Cowdery's death, that he had never denied his testimony as one of the Three Witnesses:

He always without one doubt or shudder of turning affirmed the divinity and truth of the Book of Mormon.

David Whitmer was similarly adamant that none of the Three Witnesses ever denied their affidavit that they had seen the angel Moroni, who showed them the plates of gold, and that The Book of Mormon was of divine origin – even though each of the three separated from Joseph Smith and the church they had helped him found. Before his death, Whitmer wrote:Unto all Nations, Kindreds, Tongues and People, unto whom these presents shall come: ... I wish now, standing as it were, in the very sunset of life, and in the fear of God, once [and] for all to make this public statement: That I have never at any time denied that testimony [of the Book of Mormon] or any part thereof, which has so long since been published with that book, as one of the Three Witnesses. Those who know me best well know that I have always adhered to that testimony. And that no man may be misled or doubt my present views in regard to the same, I do again affirm the truth of all my statements as then made and published ... I submit this statement to the world; God in whom I trust being my judge as to the sincerity of my motives and the faith and hope that is in me of eternal life. My sincere desire is that the world may be benefited by this plain and simple statement of the truth.

I also testify to the world, that neither Oliver Cowdery or Martin Harris ever at any time denied their testimony. ... I was present at the death bed of Oliver Cowdery, and his last words were, 'Brother David, be true to your testimony to the Book of Mormon.'Apart from the witnesses, Mormons reference other evidences for the authenticity of the Book of Mormon. 

 Smith taught—and most Mormons believe—that the existence of the Book of Mormon was prophesied by Biblical scripture.
 Mormons see the extensive use of the phrase "And it came to pass" to be a result of the alleged ancient prophet authors' use of the Hebraic transition word "wayehi".
 In 1980, researchers at Brigham Young University used a stylometric technique that they called "wordprint analysis" to examine the possible authors of the Book of Mormon. They reached the conclusion that none of the Book of Mormon selections they studied resembled writings of any of the suggested nineteenth-century authors, including Joseph Smith.
 The use of the chiasmus, a form of rhetorical parallelism, is seen by Mormons as further evidence of the Book of Mormon's historic origins, since it was also used in Biblical Hebrew. Below is an example of chiasmus in Mosiah 3:18-19:

Purported sources
Critics of the Book of Mormon cite a number of works that could have served as sources for the Book of Mormon.

King James Version of the Bible

The King James Bible (1611) may have been a source for the Book of Mormon. In total, some 478 verses in the Book of Mormon are quoted in some form from the KJV Book of Isaiah. Segments of the Book of Mormon—1 Nephi chapters 20–21 and 2 Nephi chapters 7–8 and 12–24—match nearly word-for-word Isaiah 48:1–52:2 and 2–14 (respectively). Other parallels include Mosiah 14 with KJV Isaiah 53, 3 Nephi 22 with KJV Isaiah 54, 3 Nephi 24–25 with KJV Malachi 3–4, and 3 Nephi 12–14 with KJV Matthew 5–7.

The majority of modern scholars have accepted that the sources used for the King James Version of the Bible were not the earliest or most reliable sources (see Alexandrian text-type and Dead Sea scrolls). This passage addresses believers holding snakes and drinking poison; however, it does not appear in many early biblical manuscripts and is widely believed to have been composed in the 2nd century. Additionally, the Book of Mormon reflects KJV literary and linguistic style. The KJV was the most commonly used translation of the Bible when the Book of Mormon was produced.

Deuterocanon/Apocrypha
It has been claimed that the books of the Deuterocanon, called "Apocrypha" by Protestants, were a source for the Book of Mormon. In particular, 2 Maccabees includes the name "Nephi".

Spalding's "Manuscript Found"

In 1834, E. D. Howe in his book Mormonism Unvailed introduced a theory that Smith plagiarized from the manuscript for an unpublished novel by Solomon Spalding. Howe possessed the manuscript at the time of the Book of Mormon publication. Spalding's story, called "Manuscript Story", revolves around a group of seafaring Romans who sail to the New World some two millennia ago. Critics long speculated that Smith had access to the original script and that Smith heavily plagiarized it for the Book of Mormon. The only known manuscript was discovered in 1884 and now resides at Oberlin College in Ohio. Once the manuscript was available for study, most critics discarded this theory because the "extensive parallels" were only of a few minor details: intercontinental seafaring, the existence (and use) of a seer stone, and the discovery of records under a stone (Latin parchments vs. golden plates with "reformed Egyptian" inscriptions). Most other purported similarities, attested by various witness affidavits gathered by Doctor Philastus Hurlbut, were nonexistent. Historian Fawn Brodie expressed suspicion regarding these affidavits, claiming that the style of the statements was too similar and displayed too much uniformity.

View of the Hebrews

Another purported source of the Book of Mormon is View of the Hebrews, first published in 1823 by Ethan Smith (no relation), a pastor in Poultney, Vermont. Critics argue that the works share several passages and many thematic elements. Book of Mormon witness and scribe Oliver Cowdery, and his family, had attended Ethan Smith's church since November 1821. Prior to his book's publication, Ethan Smith advocated his views regarding the origins of Native Americans in sermons to his congregations. In 1825, Ethan Smith published an expanded second edition of View of the Hebrews, the same year that Cowdery left Poultney for New York state.

Mormon apologist B. H. Roberts authored a manuscript titled Studies of the Book of Mormon, comparing the content of the Book of Mormon with View of the Hebrews. Roberts concluded, assuming a hemispheric geography theory for the Book of Mormon, sufficient parallels existed that future critics could claim that View of the Hebrews had provided a structural foundation for the Book of Mormon story. Roberts's manuscript was private and shared only with LDS Church leadership. Roberts continued to publicly support the miraculous origin theory of the Book of Mormon.

Roberts's list of parallels included:
 Extensive quotation from Isaiah
 The future gathering of Israel, and restoration of the Ten Lost Tribes
 Development of the New World from the Old via a long journey over "seas" of "many waters"
 A religious motive for the migration
 Division of the migrants into civilized and uncivilized groups with long wars between them, and the eventual destruction of the civilized by the uncivilized
 The assumption that all American natives were descended from Israelites and their languages from Hebrew
 Burial of a "lost book" with "yellow leaves"
 Description of extensive military fortifications with military observatories or "watch towers" overlooking them
 A change from monarchy to republican forms of government
 The preaching of the gospel in ancient America

David Persuitte has also presented a large number of parallels between the View of the Hebrews and the Book of Mormon, but notes there are no instances of direct copying. The parallels that Persuitte presents cover a broad range of topics, including religious ideas about the responsibility of the American people in convincing the Indians of their "Israelite" origins and converting them to Christianity. Persuitte quotes from View of the Hebrews Ethan Smith's theory about what happened to the ancient Israelites after they arrived in America. He argues that it essentially summarizes the basic narrative of the Book of Mormon, including the split into two factions (civilized and savage). Persuitte also quotes several similar descriptions of structures built by the civilized faction, the wars between the two factions, and other similarities. According to Persuitte, these are sufficient to have "inspired" Joseph Smith to have written the Book of Mormon. Joseph Smith himself mentioned Ethan Smith and cited passages from View of the Hebrews in an article from the June 1842 publication of Times and Seasons.

The Wonders of Nature
Critics have claimed several passages and thematic material in the Book of Mormon are found in Josiah Priest's The Wonders of Nature, published in 1825.

The Golden Pot
A possible inspiration for the story of the golden plates may be The Golden Pot: A Modern Fairytale, a novella by German author E. T. A. Hoffmann, first published in 1814 and first available in English in the 1827 Thomas Carlyle translation. Much of the narrative occurs in the imagination of the protagonist Anselmus. Alleged similarities include: 
 Anselmus encounters Archivarius Lindhorst, the last archivist of Atlantis
 Archivarius Lindhorst is a guardian of ancient treasures (like Moroni)
 Significant events occur on the fall equinox
 Anselmus receives a gold record with writing and is asked to decipher it

The Late War
The Late War is an account of the War of 1812 which is written by Gilbert J. Hunt in the style of the King James Bible, and was published in New York in 1816. The 2008 work Mormon Parallels and a 2010 work have discussed possible similarities. In 2013, The Late War was the subject of discussion among both ex-Mormons and Mormon apologists.

17th–19th Century Belief about Native American Origins
Belief that Native Americans were of Jewish origin was common before the publication of The Book of Mormon. Pseudo-scholarly proofs involving the Mound Builder Myth and Lost Tribes Myth remained popular until scientific advances in archaeology and DNA disproved these theories.

 Thomas Thorowgood (1650): In "Jews in America or Probabilities that the Americans are of that Race" published for the New England missionary society, Thorowgood proposes that American Indians are of Israelite origin. 
 William Penn (1683): In his "Letter to the Free Society of Traders", Penn expressed his belief that Native Americans might be descendants of the ten lost tribes of Israel. 
 James Adair (1775): In his book "The history of the American Indians", Adair provides 23 arguments over 180 pages for Jewish origin of American Indians in the section "Observations, and arguments, in proof of the American Indians being descended from the Jews".
 Jonathan Edwards (1789): Publishes a study to show supposed linguistic ties between the Mohican language (called Muhhekaneew in the study) and Hebrew.
 Charles Crawford (1801): Published his essay attempting to prove that American Indians descended from the Israelites.
 Elias Boudinot (1816): Publishes "A Star in the West; or, humble attempt to discover the long lost ten tribes of Israel, preparatory to their return to their beloved city, Jerusalem" attempting to prove that the American Indians are the descendants of Israel.
 Sarah J. Hale (1823): Imagined in her poems that the mounds built by the mound builders could have been built by the inhabitants of the ancient Semitic people of Tyre, Lebanon. "Various are the opinions respecting the origin of those ancient inhabitants who have left such indubitable traces of their Industry and civilization in America. That these mounds and fortifications were not the works of the ancestors of our present race of Indians, is universally conceded; but by what people, or at what time, they were erected, are secrets, the philosopher and antiquary have vainly attempted to discover. [...] They could not be savages according to our idea of the term. May we not rather imagine them to be exiles from some powerful eastern nation, or city, that flourished at an early period of the world. In the selection of Tyrians [Lebanon] for my adventurers, I was guided, merely by the circumstance of their superiority in maritime knowledge, connected with their power, wealth, and enterprising industry."
 Ethan Smith (1823): Publishes "View of the Hebrews" proposing that American Indians descended from ancient Jews and that the Mound Builders were these ancient ancestors who arrived in the Americas by a sea journey via the Bering Strait. The main themes in the View of the Hebrews such as a sea journey, the ancient Jews dividing into civilized and barbaric peoples with the barbaric people exterminating the civilized people, wars, and description of government, parallel those in the Book of Mormon which was published in 1830.
 Josiah Priest (1826): In his book The Wonders of Nature, Priest dedicates a chapter to "Proofs that the Indians of North America are descended from the ancient Hebrews". He states, "These are queries of great moment, at this period, when the time of their [the American Indians who are of Jewish origin] restoration is drawing near. [...] When the restoration of the Hebrews is predicted, in Isaiah xi. That God will in the last days set up an ensign for the nations; it is to 'assemble the outcasts of Israel; and gather together the dispersed of Judah from the four corners of the earth.
 Israel Worsley (1828): Publishes "A view of the American Indians, their general character, customs, language, public festivals, religious rites, and traditions: Shewing them to be the Descendants of The Ten Tribes of Israel."

Other
Mormon authors claim that the description of olive horticulture in Jacob 5 is too specific and detailed for Smith to have learned on his own in early 19th century New England, so they assert it is evidence that Smith's story of the Book of Mormon's divine origin is true. Critics assert that the narrative could have been completely based on the biblical texts in Isaiah 5 and Romans 11 and point out that midway through Jacob 5 Smith switches from an allegory of a single olive tree to an allegory of a vineyard, reflecting his imperfect use of the biblical texts.

See also
 Reformed Egyptian
 Criticism of Mormonism
 Mosiah priority
 Historicity of the Book of Mormon

Notes

References

.
.
.
.
.
.
.
.
.
.
.
.
.
.
.
.
.
.
.
.
.
.
.
.
.
.
.

Further reading

Origin
Criticism of Mormonism
Mormonism-related controversies